Teliu is a commune in Brașov County, Transylvania, Romania. It is composed of a single village, Teliu.

The commune is located in the eastern part of the county, on the banks of the river Teliu. Teliu is traversed by the National Road DN10, which connects it to Hărman commune to the west and the town of Întorsura Buzăului to the east. 

At the 2011 census, 57.7% of inhabitants were Romanians, 22.2% Hungarians and 19.1% Roma.

See also
Dacian fortress of Teliu

References

Communes in Brașov County
Localities in Transylvania
Castles of the Teutonic Knights